This is a list of properties and districts in Habersham County, Georgia that are listed on the National Register of Historic Places (NRHP).

Current listings

|}

References

Habersham
Buildings and structures in Habersham County, Georgia